The Bradford Old City Hall is a historic city hall located in Bradford, Pennsylvania, in McKean County. It was listed on the National Register of Historic Places on May 17, 1976.

The eclectic Victorian Romanesque Revival building was constructed in 1897.  The building was designed by architect Enoch A. Curtis of Fredonia, New York.  Curtis was also in charge of the building's reconstruction in 1902 after a devastating fire.  The  brick building features a four-story,  clock tower that houses a four-dialed clock created by Seth Thomas around 1910.

The building no longer functions as city hall, but remains home to some city government offices. The building is also located in a Keystone Opportunity Zone (KOZ).

See also 
 National Register of Historic Places listings in McKean County, Pennsylvania

References 
 

City and town halls on the National Register of Historic Places in Pennsylvania
Government buildings completed in 1897
Former seats of local government
City and town halls in Pennsylvania
Victorian architecture in Pennsylvania
Romanesque Revival architecture in Pennsylvania
Buildings and structures in McKean County, Pennsylvania
Clock towers in Pennsylvania
National Register of Historic Places in McKean County, Pennsylvania